Daniel James Preston (born 6 August 2000) is an English professional footballer who plays as a left back for Alfreton Town in the National League North.

Career

Nottingham Forest
Preston joined the Nottingham Forest academy in 2016. During the 2018–19 season, Preston trained with the first team under Aitor Karanka.

On 5 December 2019, Preston moved on loan to National League North side Alfreton Town. Preston made 8 appearances for Alfreton during his spell at the club.

On 3 September 2020, Preston made his second loan spell, joining EFL League Two side Grimsby Town on a season-long loan. He made his debut on 5 September 2020, starting in an EFL Cup match against Morecambe.

On 1 February 2021, Preston was recalled from his loan spell at Grimsby, having made 29 appearances.

Alfreton Town
At the end of the season, Preston was released by Forest. He spent time on trial with Forest Green Rovers in September 2021.

On 30 October 2021, Preston signed with National League North side Alfreton Town.

References

2000 births
Living people
English footballers
Nottingham Forest F.C. players
Alfreton Town F.C. players
Grimsby Town F.C. players
National League (English football) players
Association football fullbacks
English Football League players